Utaya is a rural locality (a selo), the only inhabited locality, and the administrative center of Utainsky Rural Okrug of Verkhnekolymsky District in the Sakha Republic, Russia, located  from Zyryanka, the administrative center of the district. Its population as of the 2010 Census was 98, down from 112 recorded during the 2002 Census.

Geography 
Utaya is located at the feet of the Arga-Tas range, on the right bank of the Silyap River, a right tributary of the Ozhogina River.

References

Notes

Sources
Official website of the Sakha Republic. Registry of the Administrative-Territorial Divisions of the Sakha Republic. Verkhnekolymsky District. 

Rural localities in Verkhnekolymsky District